The Singles is a greatest hits compilation album by English rock band The Bluetones.  It was released on 8 April 2002 on Superior Quality Recordings. Its offspring single was "After Hours".

Track listing
All tracks written by: Chesters, Devlin, Morriss, Morriss

  "Are You Blue or Are You Blind?" – 2:54
  "Bluetonic" – 4:04
  "Slight Return" – 3:19
  "Cut Some Rug" – 4:35
  "Marblehead Johnson" – 3:22
  "Solomon Bites the Worm" – 3:07
  "If..." – 5:08
  "Sleazy Bed Track" – 4:36
  "4-Day Weekend" – 3:54
  "Keep the Home Fires Burning" – 3:27
  "Autophilia" – 5:02
  "Mudslide" – 4:22
  "After Hours" – 3:34
  "Freeze Dried Pop (Dumb It Up)" – 2:26
  "Persuasion" – 4:08
  "The Bluetones Big Score" – 3:54

Bonus Disc (Limited Edition release only)
 After Hours
 Pretty Ballerina
 Blue
 Blue Shadows
 That's Life

This version of Pretty Ballerina is an edited version removing the band intros from the original version on 4-Day Weekend.

The Bluetones albums
Albums produced by Hugh Jones (producer)
2002 compilation albums